Albert Walmsley (21 October 1885 – 1964) was an English professional footballer who played as a right half. As a youth, he assisted Blackburn St. Peter's and later played for Lancashire Combination side Darwen before joining Football League First Division club Blackburn Rovers in 1907. He went on to play 272 league matches in a 13-year spell with the Ewood Park side. Walmsley transferred to Stockport County at the start of the 1920–21 season and spent three years at the club, scoring 3 goals in 80 league appearances.

During the 1915–16 season Walmsley played 21 matches as a wartime guest with Burnley, scoring once.

References

1885 births
1964 deaths
Footballers from Blackburn
English footballers
Association football wing halves
Darwen F.C. players
Blackburn Rovers F.C. players
Stockport County F.C. players
English Football League players
Burnley F.C. wartime guest players